(also known as the Sega Sammy Group and generally Sega Sammy, stylized as SᴇɢᴀSammy) is a Japanese global holding company formed from the merger of Sega and Sammy Corporation in 2004. Both companies are involved in the amusement industry (Sega with arcade and home video games, Sammy with pachinko machines).

Corporate history

Sega 

Sega was founded on June 3, 1960, by American businessman Martin Bromley. The company started to distribute slot machines to U.S. bases in Japan. During the 1960s, Service Games was renamed to Sega Enterprises Ltd. Sega Enterprises sold their first product, the electro-mechanical game called Periscope which became a worldwide hit. In 1969, Sega Enterprises was acquired by U.S. conglomerate Gulf & Western Industries Inc. In 1983, Sega launched the Sega Computer Videogame SG-1000, the first 8-bit video game platform. In 1986, the CSK Group acquired Sega Enterprises through capital participation. Sega Europe Ltd. was established in Europe, and in 1985, Sega Enterprises Inc. was established in the United States. These regional subsidiaries served as a marketing base for amusement arcade machines.

During 1985, Sega released Hang-On, the world's first force feedback game. Sega Enterprises was registered stock on over-the-counter (OTC) market. In 1988, Sega listed stock on the second section of Tokyo Stock Exchange. Within this year, Sega released the Sega Mega Drive/Genesis, a 16-bit home video game platform that solidified Sega's presence in the console market. During this year, Sega also launched the R-360, the world's first amusement arcade cabinet could rotate 360 degrees in all directions. In 1991, Sega released Sonic the Hedgehog as a competitor mascot to represent Sega against Nintendo's Mario, and with 15 million copies sold, Sonic the Hedgehog spawned multiple sequels over the years and became Sega's flagship franchise.

In 1992, Sega released Virtua Racing in order to utilise polygonal 3D-graphics engines, and in 1993, Sega released Virtua Fighter, the world's first polygonal 3D fighting game. In 1994, Sega launched the Sega Saturn, a 32-bit home video game platform. In 1995, Sega launched Print Club Arcades in partnership with Atlus. In 1996, Sega released Sakura Wars, a Japan exclusive sim-based Strategy RPG that became a cultural phenomenon within Japan spawning a multi-media franchise. In 1997, Sega attempted to merge with toy manufacturer Bandai with Sega as the surviving entity (which would be named Sega Bandai following the merger), but the deal eventually fell through. In 1998, Sega launched the Sega Dreamcast. In 2000, Sega Enterprises changed their name to Sega Corporation. During this year, Sega released Phantasy Star Online, the first networked role-playing game (RPG) for home video game platforms. In 2001, Sega discontinued the Dreamcast and withdrew from the console hardware industry to become a third-party video game developer and publisher.

Sammy Corporation 

Sammy Corporation was founded on November 1, 1975, as Sammy Industry Co., Ltd. by Japanese business magnate, Hajime Satomi. It was formed from Satomi Corporation's manufacturing and marketing divisions for amusement arcade machines. In the 1980s, Sammy marketed and sold Pachislot machines, and in the 1990s, Sammy expanded their portfolio by marketing and selling Pachinko machines. These two business ventures have been the primary pillar of Sammy Corporations revenue. During 1997, Sammy Industry Co., Ltd. changed its name to Sammy Corporation. By 2000, Sammy Corporation was listed in the Tokyo Stock Exchange's 1st section, indicating it as a "large company". Outside of Pachinko and Pachislot industry, Sammy Corporation was also involved in the video game industry as a publisher for fighting games such as the Guilty Gear series (developed by Arc System Works), The Rumble Fish series (developed by Dimps) and Survival Arts.

Later years 
According to the first Sega Sammy Annual Report, the merger of the two companies happened due to the companies facing difficulties. According to chairman Hajime Satomi, Sega had been in the red for nearly 10 years and lacked a clear financial base. Sammy, on the other hand, feared stagnation and overreliance of its highly profitable pachislot and pachinko machine business, and wanted to diversify its business in new fields, using Sega's broader range of involvement in different entertainment fields.

Together, as the Sega Sammy group, the company has grown and acquired and founded multiple companies.

Until 2015, the group was structured in four areas:
 The "Consumer Business", which contained video games, toys and animation.
 The "Amusement Machine Business" which contained Sega's arcade business.
 The "Amusement Center Business" which contained Sega's amusement centers and theme parks.
 The "Pachislot and Pachinko Business" is the Sammy Corporation and is the main pillar of the group's revenue.

For the better half of the first decade of the holding's existence it has sought the arcade machine sales of Sega and the pachinko sales of Sammy, as its biggest financial incentive. A shift happened in the 2010s, leading to the "Group Structure Reform" in 2015. Casinos, resorts and digital games became the biggest financial incentives. Arcade sales and packaged games from Sega has softened, while growth in pachinko sales is not anticipated.

On December 22, 2010, Sega Sammy Holdings acquired the remaining outstanding shares of TMS Entertainment, thus making TMS Entertainment a wholly owned subsidiary of Sega Sammy Holdings. In April 2017, Marza Animation Planet, Sega's CGI animation studio, was restructured into TMS Entertainment.

On November 4, 2020, it was announced that Sega Sammy would sell 85.1% of Sega Entertainment, its arcade operating business, to Genda Inc., an amusement equipment rental business, due to the effects of the COVID-19 pandemic on its arcade and amusement facilities businesses. Sega will still be involved in the arcade machine manufacturing business.

In 2021, it was announced that Sega Sammy would be a kit sponsor for J2 League club Tokyo Verdy, and their women's team, Nippon TV Tokyo Verdy Beleza, and also sponsored a Tokyo Classic match on September 26, 2021, between Verdy and crosstown rival FC Machida Zelvia.

Structure

Pachislot and Pachinko machine business 
These are the companies and subsidiaries affiliated with Sega Sammy Group's pachislot and pachinko machine business.
 Sammy Corporation
 Sammy NetWorks Co., Ltd.
 Ginza Corporation
 RODEO Co., Ltd.
 Taiyo Elec Co., Ltd.

Entertainment contents business 
The entertainment contents business provides a diverse range of entertainment from digital content to toys. These are the companies and subsidiaries affiliated with Sega Sammy Group's entertainment contents business.

 TMS Entertainment Co., Ltd.
 Jinni's Inc.
 Marza Animation Planet, Inc.
 Telecom Animation Film Co., Ltd.
 TMS Entertainment USA, Inc.
 TMS Music Co., Ltd.
 TMS Music (HK) Ltd.
 TMS Music (UK) Ltd.
 TMS Photo Co., Ltd.
 TOCSIS INC.
 Dartslive Co., Ltd.
 DARTSLIVE INTERNATIONAL Ltd
 iDarts Group Ltd.
 DARTSLIVE ASIA Ltd.
 DARTSLIVE USA, INC
 DARTSLIVE EUROPE LTD.
 Sega Group Corporation
 Atlus
 Atlus USA
 Sega Corporation
 Sega of America, Inc.
 Sega Europe Ltd.
 Amplitude Studios
 Creative Assembly
 Creative Assembly Sofia
 Hardlight
 Relic Entertainment
 Sports Interactive
 Two Point Studios
 Sega Korea Co., Ltd.
 Sega Shanghai Co., Ltd.
 Play Heart, Inc.
 Sega Logistics Service Co., Ltd.
 Sega Amusements Europe Ltd.
 Sega Amusements Taiwan Ltd.
 Sega Toys
 Sega Toys (Hk) Co., Ltd.

Resort business 
These are companies charged with operating the Sega Sammy Group's resorts, hotels, golf courses, entertainment and commercial facilities, and casinos.
 PHOENIX RESORT CO., LTD.
 PARADISE SEGASAMMY Co., Ltd.
 Sega Sammy Golf Entertainment Inc.

Other Group Companies 
 Music Publishing Label
 Wave Master Inc.
 Casino machines
 Sega Sammy Creation Inc.
 Japanese B.League basketball team
 Sun Rockers Shibuya

Related companies

Current affiliates 
 ENGI (Sammy owns 40% of the company, with Kadokawa Corporation owning 53% while making it a direct subsidiary and Ultra Super Pictures having 5%) 
 Sanrio Co., Ltd. (formerly held 13.9%, now hold 10.6% of the company)
 CA Sega Joypolis (14.9% minority ownership, the rest of the company is owned and operated by China Animations Character Co.)

Former affiliates and/or subsidiaries 
 Sammy Studios (now High Moon Studios)
 Sega Entertainment Co., Ltd. (Sega's former arcade business; majority stake sold in 2020 to Genda, with remainder sold January 2022)
 Oasis Park Co., Ltd.
 SI Electronics Ltd.
 SIMS Co., Ltd.
 Index Corporation
 Index Asia Co, Ltd.
 Technosoft
 Visual Concepts (Sold to Take-Two Interactive)
 Dimps Corporation (Sega and Sammy were major shareholders at one point, along with Bandai Namco Entertainment and Sony Interactive Entertainment)
 Japan Multimedia Services Corporation
 HONEST Co., LTD.
 InfiniTalk Co., Ltd.
 patina Co., Ltd.
 D×L CREATION Co., Ltd.
 Butterfly Corporation
 f4samurai, Inc.
 Sega Sammy BUSAN INC.

See also 
 List of conglomerates

Notes

References

External links 
 

 
Companies listed on the Tokyo Stock Exchange
Conglomerate companies based in Tokyo
Japanese companies established in 2004
Holding companies based in Tokyo
Holding companies established in 2004
Keiretsu
Software companies based in Tokyo
Video game companies established in 2004
Video game companies of Japan